Ozarba nebula is a species of moth in the family Noctuidae (the owlet moths). It was first described by William Barnes and James Halliday McDunnough in 1918 and it is found in North America.

The MONA or Hodges number for Ozarba nebula is 9033.

References

Further reading

External links
 

Eustrotiinae
Articles created by Qbugbot
Moths described in 1918